The Play-offs of the 2012 Fed Cup Americas Zone Group II were the final stages of the Group II Zonal Competition involving teams from the Americas. Using the positions determined in their pools, the seven teams faced off to determine their placing in the 2012 Fed Cup Americas Zone Group II. The top two teams advanced to Group I for the next year.

Promotion play-offs
The first and second placed teams of each pool were drawn in two head-to-head rounds. The winner of each rounds advanced to Group I for 2013.

Trinidad and Tobago vs. Mexico

Chile vs. Guatemala

5th to 6th play-offs
The third placed teams of each pool were drawn in head-to-head rounds to find the fifth and sixth placed teams.

Ecuador vs. Puerto Rico

7th to 8th play-offs
The fourth placed teams of each pool were drawn in head-to-head rounds to find the seventh and eighth placed teams.

Dominican Republic vs. Uruguay

Final Placements

  and  advanced to 2013 Fed Cup Americas Zone Group I.

See also
Fed Cup structure

References

External links
 Fed Cup website

2012 Fed Cup Americas Zone